Jal-e Akhund Mahalleh (also Romanized as Jal-e Akhūnd Maḩalleh and Jall-e Akhūndmaḩalleh) is a village in Goli Jan Rural District, in the Central District of Tonekabon County, Mazandaran Province, Iran. At the 2006 census, its population was 298, in 80 families.

References 

Populated places in Tonekabon County